Angelika Schatz (1897 – May 1975) was an Israeli artist.

Biography
Angelika Schatz was the daughter of Boris Schatz, a well-known Israeli artist, and Zhenia Zhermovsky, his first wife, she was born in Sofia, Bulgaria. Schatz went on to study art at an academy in Germany.

In 1919, Schatz married Robert Meerson. The couple lived in Hamburg, later moving to Paris. In 1923, they moved to Berlin; they had their only child, a son, there. In 1925, the couple moved to Prague, where they stayed for ten years.  She spent some time in Paris in 1928. Around 1940, Schatz and her husband divorced. During World War II, both Schatz and her son were interned for a time in labor camps. In January 1948, she went to Israel with her son. Schatz married Dan Schneider in 1951. She joined the Association of Painters and Sculptors in Tel Aviv and continued to paint but was not otherwise well-connected with the local art scene.She died in Tel Aviv at the age of 78 and was buried in Kiryat Shaul Cemetery.

Art career
In 1932, she won a gold medal at the Grand Prix, an art show in Paris. Schatz also had exhibitions in Bulgaria and Czechoslovakia. The family later moved to Sofia, where Schatz was part of a group of female artists and also published articles as an art critic.

See also
Visual arts in Israel

References 

1897 births
1975 deaths
20th-century women artists
Israeli women artists
Artists from Sofia
Artists from Paris